Henry Elliott may refer to:

 Henry Elliott (athlete) (born 1946), French high jumper
 Henry Wood Elliott (1846–1930), American watercolor painter, author, and environmentalist
 Henry Wood Elliott II (1920–1976), American physician and pharmacologist
 Henry Venn Elliott (1792–1865), English divine
 Henry S. Elliott (1858–1942), American attorney and politician

See also
Henry Elliot (disambiguation)
Henry Eliot (disambiguation)

Harry Elliott (disambiguation)